This is a list of seasons played by Valencia CF in Spanish and European football, from 1919 to the most recent completed season. It details the club's achievements in major competitions, and the top scorers for each season.

The club has won the Liga six times, the Spanish Cup eight times, the Spanish Super Cup one time, the Copa Eva Duarte one time, the UEFA Cup three times, the European Cup Winners' Cup one time, the European Super Cup twice and the Intertoto Cup one time but has never won the UEFA Champions League, finishing runners-up twice.

Key

Key to league record:
 Pos = Final position
 Pld = Matches played
 W = Matches won
 D = Matches drawn
 L = Matches lost
 GF = Goals for
 GA = Goals against
 Pts = Points

Key to rounds:
 W = Winners
 F = Final (Runners-up)
 SF = Semi-finals
 QF = Quarter-finals
 R16 = Round of 16
 R32 = Round of 32
 R64 = Round of 64

 R5 = Fifth round
 R4 = Fourth round
 R3 = Third round
 R2 = Second round
 R1 = First round
 GS = Group stage

Seasons

86 seasons in La Liga
4 seasons in Segunda División

References

External links
 RSSSF.com
 Ciberche.net

seasons
 
Valencia
Seasons